The Designmuseum Denmark is a museum in Copenhagen for Danish and international design and crafts. It features works of famous Danish designers like Arne Jacobsen, Jacob Jensen and Kaare Klint, who was one of the two architects who remodeled the former Frederiks Hospital (built 1752–57) into a museum in the 1920s. The exhibition also features a variety of Chinese and German porcelain.

The museum was known as the Danish Museum of Art & Design until 2011 and known as the Danish Museum of Decorative Art prior.

The museum is currently closed for major renovations, and is expected to reopen to the public in early 2022.

History
The museum was founded in 1890 at the initiative of, among others, Industriforeningen. A purpose-built building designed by Vilhelm Klein and located next to Industriforeningen's premises on City Hall Square was completed in 1894 and opened to the public the following year. The exhibitions were housed in separate galleries, each dedicated to a particular field such as porcelain, faience, silver, furniture, glass and textiles. This arrangement reflected the primary aim of the museum which was to serve as a source of inspiration for craftsmen and manufacturers by highlighting the very best in craftsmenship and design from different ages.

In 1926 the museum moved to its current building, the defunct Frederick's Hospital from 1757, a gift from the banker Emil Glückstadt. The architects Kaare Klint and Ivar Bentsen had undertaken the necessary alterations and furnishings.

Library and archives

The museum is home to the largest library in Scandinavia dedicated to decorative arts and industrial design. Open to the general public, the library is at once a museum library, research library, and Danish central library within its field. Opening hours are Tuesday–Friday from 11–17. The library contains more than 1,000 journals. The latest issues of the 75 journals and magazines which the museum subscribes to can be read in the library's reading room.

The reading room of the library hosts public lectures on design-related topics which draw upon the collections in both the museum and the library.

The Danish Design Archive and the Poster Collection are located on the museum's first floor.

Furnitureindex 
Designmuseum Denmark hosts the Furnitureindex, an online database of Danish furniture from the 20th and 21st centuries. The database is in English and contains over 12,000 records. The database was founded in 2000 by Marilyn and Reese Palley as the Palley Index Of Danish Furniture: 1900-2000. Designmuseum Denmark made the database publicly available online in 2003 after it was acquired by the Realdania Foundation.

Auditorium
The museum has a small auditorium on the first floor seating 120 people. It is rented out for lectures, concerts, receptions and other events.

Cultural references
In the first Olsen Gang film, Bredgade 68 is where the Olsen Gang steals the golden statue.

See also
 David Collection
 Danish Design Centre
 Danish design
 Danish modern
 List of museums in Denmark

References

External links

 Danish Museum of Art & Design: website
 Furnitureindex.dk furnitureindex.dk:  Danish furniture from the 20th and 21st centuries

Art museums and galleries in Copenhagen
Decorative arts museums
Modernist architecture in Copenhagen
1890 establishments in Denmark
Art museums established in 1890
Design museums
Art exhibitions in Denmark
Listed hospital buildings in Copenhagen